Hakuba Takeshi (白馬毅, born May 5, 1983) is a former sumo wrestler from Ulan Bator, Mongolia. Joining the professional sport in 2000, he entered the top division for the first time in 2008, returning in 2010. His highest rank was komusubi. He was forced to retire from sumo in 2011 after being found guilty by the Japan Sumo Association (JSA) of involvement in match-fixing.

Early life and sumo background
Ariunbayar Unurjargal had little background in sports. However, his aunt living in Japan had an acquaintance who knew the coach of Tatsutagawa stable. He was encouraged to come to Japan and try out.  The Tatsutagawa coach had originally intended for Hakuba to join another stable in the same ichimon, Michinoku, as his own stable would be disbanded upon his impending retirement.  However, at the time of Hakuba's entry in January 2000, Michinoku already had its Japan Sumo Association designated limit of foreign wrestlers. Hakuba was therefore allowed to join Tatsutagawa after all, with the understanding he would join Michinoku upon Tatsutagawa being shut down, which occurred in September 2000. His shikona or fighting name was chosen by Michinoku's support committee and combines the character for "white", because a white star is what a winning bout is called in sumo terminology, and the character for "horse", an emotive image of Mongolia.

Career
Exactly a year after entering sumo, he won the jonidan division championship or yūshō, the first his stable had had. However, after this he struggled for several years in the middle division ranks. A streak of success in 2006, culminating in the makushita championship in the last tournament of 2006, would finally grant him promotion to jūryō in January 2007. He never dropped below again, but after breaking into the top makuuchi division for the first time in May 2008 he was demoted after only one tournament. His rise to makuuchi was the second slowest for a foreigner after Sentoryū. His second appearance in makuuchi at his highest yet achieved rank of maegashira 14 was in January 2010 and he secured his kachi-koshi by Day 10, finishing on 9–6. This took him to a new highest rank to date of maegashira 9 in March. He came through with another winning record there and was promoted to maegashira 5 for the May tournament.

The May 2010 basho was Hakuba's most successful yet. He scored ten wins from his new highest rank, and defeated two ōzeki, fellow Mongolian Harumafuji (in his first bout against an ōzeki), and Kotoōshū. He was rewarded with promotion to komusubi for the July 2010 tournament, becoming the first member of the old Tatsutagawa stable to reach the titled san'yaku ranks and the first from Michinoku since the present stablemaster (former ōzeki Kirishima) took over in 1997. He could manage only four wins in his komusubi debut.

Hakuba was one of 23 wrestlers found guilty of fixing the result of bouts after an investigation by the Japan Sumo Association, and he was forced to retire in April 2011.

Since 2013 he has been working at a restaurant called "Ulaanbaatar" in Ryōgoku run by his mother, specializing in Mongolian food.

Fighting style
He was a yotsu-sumo specialist, preferring grappling techniques. His favoured grip on his opponent's mawashi was hidari-yotsu, a right hand outside, left hand inside position. His most common winning kimarite is a straightforward yori-kiri or force out. He also regularly employed both uwatenage (overarm throw) and shitatenage (underarm throw). He often used henka (side-stepping) at the tachi-ai for which he was routinely criticized.

Personal life
Some tabloids in Japan had implied his romantic relationships with several female celebrities, including glamour model Nozomi Sasaki until he announced publicly in January 2010 that he had married the younger sister of fellow Mongolian rikishi Tokitenkū on October 3, 2008. The wedding ceremony took place on June 18, 2011 at Tokyo's Metropolitan Hotel, which Hakuba combined with his danpatsu-shiki or retirement ceremony. He has a daughter born in November 2008.

Career record

See also
Glossary of sumo terms
List of non-Japanese sumo wrestlers
List of past sumo wrestlers
List of komusubi

References

External links
 

1983 births
Living people
Mongolian sumo wrestlers
Komusubi
Sportspeople from Ulaanbaatar
Sportspeople banned for life